Camillo Serafini (April 21, 1864 – March 21, 1952) was an Italian Marquis and the only Governor of Vatican City from 11 February 1929 – 21 March 1952.He was a noted numismatist.

The Marquis and Cardinal Domenico Serafini, Prefect of Propagation of the Faith, belonged to the same family.

References

Publications
Camillo Serafini, Catalogo delle monete e bolle plumbee pontificie del Medagliere Vaticano,
Camillo Serafini, "Le monete e le bolle plumbee pontificie del Medagliere Vaticano", 4 voll., Milano, 1908–1927.
Camillo Serafini, Della collezione di Celati di monete pontificie acquistata per il Medagliere Vaticano dal Pontefice Benedetto XV.
Camillo Serafini, L’arte nei ritratti della moneta romana repubblicana; [Camillo Serafini]. - Roma, 1897. - p. 3-34, 1 tav. ; 27 cm. - Estr. da: Bullettino della commissione archeologica comunale di Roma, 25 (1897), fasc.1
Camillo Serafini, Saggio intorno alle monete e medaglioni antichi ritrovati nelle catacombe di Panfilo sulla via Salaria Vetus in Roma, in Scritti in onore di Bartolomeo Nogara raccolti in occasione del suo LXX anno, Roma, Tipografia del Senato, 1937, pp. 421–443.

External links
Biblioteca Apostolica Vaticana
Nobile Collegio

Italian numismatists
Vatican City people
1952 deaths
1864 births